The Potomac River Rapist refers to a serial rapist and murderer who was active in the Washington, D.C. metropolitan area from 1991 to 1998. Ten sexual assaults and one murder were linked to the suspect by DNA. In November 2019, a suspect identified as Giles Daniel Warrick (October 16, 1959  November 19, 2022) was arrested and charged in connection with the rapes and murder.

Crimes 
The perpetrator is known to be responsible for ten sexual assaults, one of which ended in murder. Each of the attacks have been linked by DNA:

Sexual Assaults

Murder of Christine Mirzayan 
On August 1, 1998, at around 10:30 to 11pm EDT, Christine Mirzayan was walking home in the Georgetown neighborhood of Washington, D.C. when she was dragged into the woods. Mirzayan yelled out and a man responded, asking if she was okay. There was no response from Mirzayan so the man continued on. The next day, she was found raped and murdered by a blow to the head. The police asked for the public's help after the murder and another person who had heard Mirzayan scream during the murder came forward and provided law enforcement with a description of a man who they saw running out of the woods moments after the scream. This description was enough to provide the public with a composite sketch of the suspect.

Investigation 
In 2011, the Federal Bureau of Investigation launched a new website in an attempt to bring public attention to the cold case. The site includes a podcast about the crimes, videos, and other information about the case.

Police requested help from Parabon Nanolabs genetic genealogy team who used DNA from the crime scenes to create a family tree for the perpetrator.  Parabon suggested five possible suspects to the police and on November 13, 2019, they arrested one of them, Giles Warrick, a 60-year-old man from Conway, South Carolina, who had worked as a landscaper in Maryland at the time of the rapes and murder. He was subsequently charged in connection with the crimes.

On November 19, 2022, the Metropolitan Police Department reported that Warrick had been found dead in his cell in the D.C. Central Detention Facility. Officials believed that Warrick, whose trial was scheduled to begin that month, took his own life.

See also
 Parabon NanoLabs

References

External link 
Potomac River Rapist Cold Case, Federal Bureau of Investigation.

20th-century American criminals
American murderers
American rapists
American male criminals
Rape in the United States